Kan Khan-e Yaqub (also Romanized as Kan Khān-e Ya‘qūb; also known as Kankhvān) is a village in Mirbag-e Jonubi Rural District, in the Central District of Delfan County, Lorestan Province, Iran. At the 2006 census, its population was 23, in 5 families.

References 

Towns and villages in Delfan County